The Col de Montgenèvre (elevation 1860 m.) is a high mountain pass in the Cottian Alps, in France 2 kilometres away from  Italy.

Description
The pass takes its name from the village Montgenèvre (Hautes-Alpes), which lies in the vicinity. It links Briançon in the upper Durance valley with the Susa Valley and its communes of Cesana Torinese and Susa in the Metropolitan City of Turin, Piedmont.

The Col de Montgenèvre is an important road connection, and is kept open in winter. Its importance has always lain in the fact that it is the lowest of the principal crossings of the main range of the Alps between France and Italy.

History
It was known to the Romans before 118 BC, when Gnaeus Domitius Ahenobarbus started construction of the Via Domitia road, which terminated at the pass. Roman General Pompey used it on his campaign to Spain in 77 BC and claimed to have opened up a more favorable route. It was later used by Julius Caesar in travelling to Gaul and then became the main route for travel between Roman Italy and southern Gaul or Spain.

The Col de Montgenèvre is considered a possible route for Hannibal's famous passage through the Alps on his journey from the Rhône river valley to Italy.

Through this pass, Charles VIII of France led his army in September 1494 on his way to capture the Kingdom of Naples, which would spark 65 years of intermittent warfare up and down the Italian Peninsula, later known as the Italian Wars.

The strategic importance of the pass, the lowest over this part of the Alps, caused several forts to be built, such as Briançon and Fort Janus.

Tour de France
The Col de Montgenèvre has appeared on the Tour de France 10 times.:

Tour de France Stage Finish

Other Appearances in the Tour de France

See also
 Cottii Regnum
 List of highest paved roads in Europe
 List of mountain passes

References

External links 
Col de Montgenèvre on Google Maps (Tour de France classic climbs)

Mountain passes of the Alps
Mountain passes of Provence-Alpes-Côte d'Azur
Monginevro
Col de Montgenevre
Metropolitan City of Turin
France–Italy border crossings
Transport in Provence-Alpes-Côte d'Azur